Helgi Daníelsson may refer to:

 Helgi Daníelsson (footballer, born 1981), Icelandic footballer
 Helgi Daníelsson (footballer, born 1933), Icelandic footballer